Downing House may refer to:

T. B. Downing House, Palo Alto, California, listed on the National Register of Historic Places (NRHP) in Santa Clara County
Rogers–Downing House, Andover, Massachusetts, listed on the NRHP
Downing House (Memphis, Missouri), listed on the NRHP in Missouri
Lewis Downing Jr. House, Concord, New Hampshire, listed on the NRHP in Merrimack County
John Downing Jr. House, Middleport, Ohio, listed on the NRHP
Hunt Downing House, Exton, Pennsylvania, listed on the NRHP